The following is a list of notable Uruguayan journalists:

A–D

Hugo Alfaro
Homero Alsina Thevenet
Danilo Arbilla
Lucho Avilés
César Batlle Pacheco
Rafael Batlle Pacheco
Jorge Batlle Ibáñez
José Batlle y Ordóñez
Luis Batlle Berres
Salvador Bécquer Puig
Washington Beltrán Mullin
Virginia Bolten
Natalio Félix Botana
Emiliano Cotelo
Isidoro de María
Ramón Díaz 
César di Candia
Carlos María Domínguez

F–L

Pedro Figari
Manuel Flores Mora
Eduardo Galeano
Jorge Gestoso
Julio César Grauert
Ernesto Herrera
Luis Alberto de Herrera
Luis Alberto Lacalle

M–Q

Carlos Maggi
Walter Martínez
Luis Melián Lafinur
Eudoro Melo
Alejandro Michelena
Zelmar Michelini
Víctor Hugo Morales
Benito Nardone
María Inés Obaldía
Jorge Pacheco Areco
Isabel Pisano
Carlos Quijano

R–Z

Carlos María Ramírez
Eduardo Rodríguez Larreta
Blanca Rodríguez
Renán Rodríguez
Rómulo Rossi
Antonio Rubio Pérez
Florencio Sánchez
Julio María Sanguinetti
Margherita Sarfatti
Olhinto María Simoes
Enrique Tarigo
Jorge Traverso
José Pedro Varela
Raúl Zibechi
Alfredo Zitarrosa

References

 
Journalist
Uruguayan